Crosswinds is the second studio album by the folk rock band Capercaillie. It was recorded in three days and mixed in two.

Track listing
 "Puirt a Beul/Snug in a Blanket (Jigs)" – 6:11
 "Soraidh Bhuam Gu Barraidh" – 3:28
 "Glen Orchy/Rory MacLeod" – 3:40
 "Am Buachaille Ban" – 3:36
 "The Haggis (Reels)" – 6:01
 "Brenda Stubbert's Set" – 3:35
 "Ma Theid Mise Tuilleagh" – 3:02
 "David Glen's" – 4:33
 "Urnaigh a' Bhan-Thigreach" – 3:08
 "My Laggan Love/Fox on the Town" – 4:26
 "An Ribhinn Donn" – 2:56

References

Capercaillie (band) albums
1987 albums
Scottish Gaelic music